Lauren Mayhew is an American singer, actress and former ring announcer for ECW.

Life and career
Mayhew was born to David Mayhew, an orthopaedic surgeon and Sharon Mayhew, a nurse. She has a sister named Briana. At the age of 8, she starred in the PBS series, The Reppies. At the age of 9 she was a finalist in the national Wilhemnia contest. A judge, Marilyn Zitner, who was a manager in New York, signed her. She booked the role of Marah Lewis on Guiding Light.

Lauren took a break from acting and signed with Sony Records to be part of the group PYT, a girl group composed of Mayhew and three of her childhood friends. PYT went on to release an album and tour with Destiny's Child, 'N Sync, and Britney Spears. Lauren performed at the preshow for the Super Bowl, and has been featured in numerous magazines with PYT. She has also appeared in music videos with Mandy Moore, Faith Hill, and two of her own music videos with PYT. After PYT broke up, she joined her former bandmate Lydia Bell in a new group called "Turning Point".

In her feature film debut, New Line Cinema's Raise Your Voice, Lauren starred as Hilary Duff's arch-rival "Robin," where she played the role of a cynical and malicious diva. She later appeared in the direct-to-video movie American Pie Presents: Band Camp as Arianna. She has also guest starred on such shows as: CSI: Crime Scene Investigation, CSI: Miami, Law & Order, Joan of Arcadia, Medical Investigation, and had a recurring role for one season on NBC's drama American Dreams and Showtime's Dexter.

Lauren is involved with The Alliance for Eating Disorders Awareness, a charitable organization in helping to prevent against eating disorders. Currently, she has released singles, "Renegade" through Tipsy Records and "Don't Cry" through Artists Intelligence Agency. She graduated from UCLA in Los Angeles.

Mayhew began working for the World Wrestling Entertainment (WWE) professional wrestling promotion as a ring announcer for its ECW brand during the October 6, 2009 episode of ECW. In late November 2009, Lauren's short-term contract with WWE expired and was not renewed, as the two parties could not come to an agreement for a longer-term contract.

Mayhew also writes and licenses her music to film and TV. She has had songs on NBC's The Voice, Lifetime's Dance Moms, MTV's The Hills, E Network's Giulianna and Bill, Universal's Bring It On: In It to Win It, a national commercial for Klondike Bar, and assorted other works.

Mayhew also released a song called, "What Is Love." The music video features UFC celebrity athletes such as Urijah Faber and was debuted on FOX Sports 1 UFC Tonight program. The video was picked up by over 50 blogs and TV outlets. An interview was even featured on the homepage of FOX SPORTS website. Mayhew created this song with Belgium production team Highbreeze.

Mayhew can also be seen acting and hosting. In September 2014, she joined the cast of TheStream.TV to host The Flash After Show for them, which airs every Tuesday. She also starred in a feature film called Searching for Katie which was released in 2014 and a new web series called Escort, where she plays the leading lady, Em Wilson.

In 2017, in collaboration with the Italian DJ and producer Niky G, she released the single Dead Awake.

In 2018 Mayhew was asked to be an Official Billboard Dance DJ Reporter. She also became a resident DJ for TAO Group's largest nightclub properties in NYC: Marquee and Lavo.

In 2019 Mayhew started a side project with West Palm Beach based female DJ, Chanel Claire, called Deuces Wild. The pair secured a residency at Park MGMs' 'On The Record' nightclub and Jemma Pool in Vegas. They are managed by Blackout Artists. In this same year Mayhew also booked a series regular role in DreamWorks' spinoff "Trollstopia" (from the two hit feature films: "Trolls"). The show debuted Nov 19th, 2020 on Hulu and PeacockTV.

Discography

Singles
 "What Is Love" (2014)
 "Danger Zone" – Noah Kickback & Lauren Mayhew (2015)
 "Wake Up" (2017)
 "One More Try" (DJ Infinite Sole remix) (2013)
 "Frequency" – A-leo & Lauren Mayhew (2016)
 "Shadow" feat. Ryon Lawford (2016)
 "Shark In The Water" – Robert Abigail, Wildvibes & Lauren Mayhew (2016)
 "I'll Be" – RUBYCK feat. Lauren Mayhew (2016)
 "Dead Awake" - Niky G & Lauren Mayhew feat. Phaasm (2017)
 "Renegade" – Kastra & Lauren Mayhew (2018)
 "Feels Good" – Keenan Cahill feat. Lauren Mayhew (2018)
 "Hush" – Catdealers X Lauren Mayhew (2018)
 "Shockwave" – Lauren Mayhew & Audax (2019)
 "Lies" – Lauren Mayhew, Kymber McClay, and INViDA (2020)
 "We Are Home" – Lauren Mayhew & Mariline (2020)
 "BOYS" – Lauren Mayhew & INViDA (2021)

Albums
 Mayhem (2006)

Filmography

References

External links 

 
 

American film actresses
American television actresses
American video game actresses
American voice actresses
Living people
20th-century American actresses
American singer-songwriters
Professional wrestling announcers
21st-century American actresses
20th-century American singers
21st-century American singers
20th-century American women singers
21st-century American women singers
Year of birth missing (living people)